Franck Herman Blahoua Betra (born 18 December 1996) is a French professional footballer who plays as a forward for Championnat National 2 club Rouen.

Personal life

Born in France with Ivorian descent, Betra refused to play for youth national teams of France because he wanted to remain eligible to represent Ivory Coast at international level.

References

External links
 

French footballers
Association football forwards
1996 births
Living people
French sportspeople of Ivorian descent
Black French sportspeople
Sheffield Wednesday F.C. players
PAS Giannina F.C. players
KF Trepça '89 players
Football Club 93 Bobigny-Bagnolet-Gagny players
Angoulême Charente FC players
US Lusitanos Saint-Maur players
FC Rouen players
Super League Greece players
Championnat National 2 players
French expatriate footballers
Expatriate footballers in England
Expatriate footballers in Greece
Expatriate footballers in Kosovo
French expatriate sportspeople in England
French expatriate sportspeople in Greece
French expatriate sportspeople in Kosovo